Peggy Hessen Følsvik (born on 12 November 1960) is a Norwegian trade unionist.

She was elected first deputy leader of Norwegian Confederation of Trade Unions at the LO congress in 2017. In March 2021, she became the president of the union after the death of Hans-Christian Gabrielsen. She previously worked as a cabin crew in Widerøes Flyveselskap and Braathens SAFE where she was elected full-time shop steward in 1998. She was elected deputy head of Trade and Office in Norway in 2004 and was the first secretary of LO from 2013 to 2017.

References 

1960 births
living people
People from Giske
Norwegian trade unionists